Attkisson is a surname. Notable people with the surname include:

Frank Attkisson (1955–2017), American politician
Sharyl Attkisson (born 1961), American journalist and television correspondent